
Missy is a feminine first name. 

Missy may also refer to:

Places
 Missy, Calvados, a commune in the Calvados département, France
 Missy, Switzerland, a municipality in the canton of Vaud, Switzerland

Other uses
 Missy (cow), the most expensive cow in the world
 A variant of the title Miss, used to describe a young woman
 MISSY, Microdata Information System

People with the surname de Missy
 César de Missy (1703–1775), Prussian theologian, chaplain to King George III, New Testament scholar and book collector
 Jean Rousset de Missy (1686–1762), French Huguenot writer, historian and journalist
 Samuel de Missy (1755-1820), French trader and businessman

See also
 Missy-aux-Bois, a town and commune in the Aisne département, France
 Missy-lès-Pierrepont, a village and commune in the Aisne département
 Missy-sur-Aisne, a village and commune in the Aisne département 
 
 Misses, a standard women's clothing sizes in the United States